Elections to the Himachal Pradesh Legislative Assembly were held in December 2007, to elect members of the 68 constituencies in Himachal Pradesh, India. The Bharatiya Janata Party won a majority of seats as well as the popular vote, and Prem Kumar Dhumal was reappointed as the Chief Minister of Himachal Pradesh.

The number of constituencies were set as 68, as per the recommendations of The Delimitation of Parliamentary and Assembly Constituencies Order, 1976.

Results
Source:

Elected members
Source:

References

External links
Chief Electoral Officer, Himachal Pradesh

 State Assembly elections in Himachal Pradesh
2000s in Himachal Pradesh
Himachal